The Lebanon Mountain Trail (LMT) is a long-distance hiking trail in Lebanon. It extends from Andaket in north of Lebanon to Marjayoun in the south along a  path that transects more than 76 towns and villages at altitudes ranging from 570 to 2,073 meters (1,870 to 6,800 feet) above sea level. 

The LMT passes through UNESCO heritage sites, nature reserves, and protected areas, and consists of footpaths, dirt and paved roads, river crossings, and a wide ranges of terrain types. Parts of the trail have been used by shepherds and farmers for generations; others are footpaths dating back to antiquity.  

The LMT is the only long-distance trail in Lebanon. Though there are several campgrounds along the trail, Lebanon does not have much of a camping culture, so backpacking on the LMT usually means hiking sections of the trail between villages and staying in a B&B or guesthouse overnight. 

Projects like the LMT are important for Lebanon during the country's financial and political turmoil. In 2019, hikers spent over $100,000 in villages along the trail, creating a major incentive for locals to preserve and protect their heritage. 

Most of the trail can be freely accessed by anyone. A permit is only required for the southernmost part of the trail, which foreign visitors can get from the office of the Army Security Service.

History 

The Lebanon Mountain Trail was proposed in 2002 by Joseph Karam, president of the US-based consulting company ECODIT, while thinking of ways to develop ecotourism products in Lebanon. Taking inspiration from the Appalachian Trail in the US, he conceptualized the idea with his colleague Karim El-Jisr, and in 2005 applied for grant funding from USAID Lebanon. ECODIT was awarded $3.3 million to implement the project between 2006 and 2008, and to establish the Lebanon Mountain Trail Association (LMTA) to "ensure the long-term sustainability of the trail".

In 2021, the German Government in partnership with the International Labour Organization invested $1.1 million in the LMTA through the KfW Development bank to fund maintenance of 590 kilometers of the main trail and side trails. Between 2021 and 2022, over 1300 temporary workers were hired to upgrade the existing trails and add additional side trails.

The LMT has been affected by Lebanon's economic crisis and the state of the country, including the Lebanese liquidity crisis, the 2020 Beirut Explosion, and COVID-19, which caused a large decrease in tourism. Since 2019, the LMTA has been soliciting donations from hikers and the online community to help maintain the trail.

Thru-hiking 
Every spring, the LMTA hosts a group thru-hike that covers the full trail in one month. More than 200 hikers join every year, though the number who complete the full trail is much smaller. 

Many hikers also choose to hike the trail alone, or with a local guide. However due to limited information on solo hikers, the actual number of hikers is unknown.

Fastest known times 
On May 1, 2021, Ali Kedami and Nayla Cortas completed the LMT together in 6 days 12 hours and 15 minutes. Nayla also became the first woman to run the LMT. The previous record of 6 days and 17 hours was set in June 2017 by Patrick Vaughan.

Notable locations 

 Kadisha Valley
 Cedars of God
 Mount Lebanon

Sections 
The LMT is divided into 27 sections, each of which is 9–24 km long and can be hiked in one day:

Section 0: Andaket–Qobaiyat

 Qobaiyat-Tachea
 Tachea–Qemmamine
 Qemmamine–Kfar Bnine
 Kfar Bnine–Sir Dinniyeh
 Sir Ed Dinnieh–Ehden
 Ehden–Qannoubine
 Qannoubine–Bsharri
 Bsharri–Hasroun
 Hasroun–Tannourine
 Tannourine El Faouqa–Aaqoura
 Aaqoura–Afqa
 Afqa–Hrajel
 Hrajel–Kfar Aaqab
 Kfar Aaqab–Baskinta
 Baskinta–Mtain
 Mtain–Falougha
 Falougha–Aain Zhalta
 Aain Zhalta–Barouk
 Barouk–Maasser
 Maasser–Niha
 Niha–Jezzine
 Jezzine-Aaytanit
 Aaytanit-Kawkaba Bou Aarab
 Kawkaba Bou Aarab–Rashaya
 Rachaya–Hasbaya
 Hasbaya–Marjayoun

Side trails 

 Douma side trail
 Ehmej side trail
 Baskinta side trail
 Bkassine side trail

External links 
Lebanon Mountain Trail Association

USAID document

Sport in Lebanon
Hiking trails in Lebanon